Isla El Requeson, is an island in the Gulf of California, located within Bahía Concepción east of the Baja California Peninsula. The island is uninhabited and is part of the Mulegé Municipality.

Biology
Isla El Requeson has only one species of reptile, Urosaurus nigricauda (black-tailed brush lizard).

References

Further reading

Islands of the Gulf of California
Islands of Baja California Sur
Uninhabited islands of Mexico